Amrum Bank (North Frisian: Oomrambeenk) is an undersea bank in the North Sea approximately 54 km from Amrum island and 60 km from Heligoland.

Landforms of the North Sea
Undersea banks of the Atlantic Ocean